David T. Ho is an American scientist who works at the University of Hawaii at Manoa.  He is known for his work on air-sea gas transfer, mangrove carbon cycling, and tracer oceanography.  He also created the Bamboo Bike Project, with John Mutter in 2006, which has spurred growth in the number of groups and companies creating bamboo bicycles around the world.

Background

David Ho was awarded a Ph.D. in Earth and Environmental Sciences from Columbia University in New York in 2001. After a short postdoc at Princeton University, he returned to the Lamont–Doherty Earth Observatory (LDEO) of Columbia University and continued his research there until 2008, when he moved to the University of Hawaii at Manoa. Ho was also Chief Scientist on the Southern Ocean Gas Exchange Experiment, a multi-agency funded effort to study air-sea gas exchange in the Southern Ocean.  He has published over 50 research papers. Ho is an invited professor in the Department of Geosciences at the École normale supérieure.

Bamboo Bike Project 
Ho started the Bamboo Bike Project together with earth science professor John Mutter, and bicycle maker Craig Calfee. They brought simple, low-cost bicycle designs primarily made of bamboo to Ghana, teaching local craftsmen to build them. The aim was to contribute to poverty reduction by facilitating locally-made affordable transportation. They planned to implement the project in African Millennium Villages, as part of the UN Millennium Development Goals. In 2007 he received seed funding for the project from Columbia's Earth Institute.

References

External links 
 http://www.ldeo.columbia.edu/user/david
 http://www.bamboobike.org

Year of birth missing (living people)
Princeton University people
University of Hawaiʻi faculty
Living people
American oceanographers
Columbia College (New York) alumni
Columbia Graduate School of Arts and Sciences alumni